University of Bahr El-Ghazal (UBG) is a university in South Sudan located in Wau, the capital of Western Bahr El Ghazal State. 

It was established in 1991.

Location
The University is located in the city of Wau, in Wau County, Wau State in the Bahr El Ghazal Region in the northwestern part of South Sudan.

History
UBG is a public university. The university was established in 1991, in response to the educational needs of the citizens of South Sudan. It is one of the five public universities in the country; the other four being: 
 Juba National University in Juba, 
 Dr.John Garang University in Bor
 Alexandria University in Tonj
 Rumbek University in Rumbek, 
 University of Northern Bahr El-Ghazal in Aweil, 
 Upper Nile University in Malakal.

The Vice Chancellor of Bahr El-Ghazal University is Professor.Dr. Samson Samuel Wassara.  In 2020 Awut Deng Achuil was appointed the chair of the council of the university, the first woman to head a university in South Sudan.

Colleges
, the university maintains the following colleges:
 College of Medicine and Health Sciences (CMHS)
 Institute of Public Health and Environmental Sciences
 College of Economics and Social Studies
 College of Education
 College of Veterinary Sciences
 College of Agriculture - (2018)
 Intermediate Diploma Program (3 years diploma)

External links
 Location of Wau At Google Maps
Future Prospects of Public Universities In South Sudan

See also
 Wau, South Sudan
 Wau County
 Western Bahr el Ghazal
 Bahr el Ghazal
 Education in South Sudan
 List of universities in South Sudan

References

Universities in South Sudan
Western Bahr el Ghazal
Bahr el Ghazal
Educational institutions established in 1991
1991 establishments in Sudan